The 1988 Vuelta a Murcia was the fourth edition of the Vuelta a Murcia cycle race and was held on 1 March to 6 March 1988. The race started in Mazarrón and finished in Murcia. The race was won by Carlos Hernández Bailo.

General classification

References

1988
1988 in road cycling
1988 in Spanish sport